The Brücke Museum in Berlin houses the world's largest collection of works by members of the group Die Brücke ("The Bridge"), an early 20th-century German expressionist movement.

Origins

Opened in 1967, it features around 400 paintings and sculptures and several thousand drawings, watercolours and prints by members of Die Brücke, the movement founded in 1905 in Dresden. The collection includes a donation from the painter Karl Schmidt-Rottluff to the state of Berlin, and a later donation from Erich Heckel featuring key works from the early years of the movement.

Location
The museum is located in an idyllic natural setting in Dahlem, not far from the former studio of the sculptor Arno Breker. It conducts research into works by the founding members of the movement and their early 20th-century milieu and contemporaries. The museum presents both a continually changing selection of its own works, and frequent special exhibitions of works on loan.

Notes

External links

Brücke Museum website

Art museums and galleries in Berlin
Buildings and structures in Steglitz-Zehlendorf
Modern art museums in Germany
Art museums established in 1967
1967 establishments in Germany